Radford is an unincorporated community in Christian County, Illinois, United States.

The community has the name of George Radford, a local landowner.
Despite once being a thriving community with a post office, all that remains of Radford is one residence.  Google maps currently shows two homes but the southernmost home was razed in recent years.  Mail for Radford should be addressed to Moweaqua, IL  62550.

References

Unincorporated communities in Christian County, Illinois
Unincorporated communities in Illinois